This is a list of the Canadian Hot 100 number-one singles of 2023. The Canadian Hot 100 is a chart that ranks the best-performing singles of Canada. Its data, published by Billboard magazine and compiled by Nielsen SoundScan, is based collectively on each single's weekly physical and digital sales, as well as airplay and streaming.

Chart history

See also
List of number-one digital songs of 2023 (Canada)
List of number-one albums of 2023 (Canada)

References

Canada Hot 100
2023
2023 in Canadian music